The Algerian Athletics Championships is an annual outdoor competition in the sport of athletics that is organised by the Algerian Athletics Federation which serves as the national championship for Algeria. It was first held in 1963, following Algeria's independence from France after the Algerian War, and featured both men's and women's events. Prior to that, Algerians had competed in the French Athletics Championships. Most of the winners have been Algerian nationals, though a small number of invited foreign athletes have won events at the competition.

Men

100 metres
1963: Ali Brakchi
1964: ?
1965: Nadim Nekrouf
1966: Nadim Nekrouf
1967: Bengarnout
1968: Benhabylès
1969: Benhabylès
1970: El Hadi Sayah
1971: Toufik Chaouch
1972: El Hadi Sayah
1973: Toufik Chaouch
1974: ?
1975: Toufik Chaouch
1976: 
1977: Brahim Badi
1978: 
1979: Abdelkader Kaci
1980: Brahim Badi
1981: Abdeslam Kaddouri
1982: Mahieddine Matmati
1983: Ali Bakhta
1984: Djamel Boudebidah
1985: Mustapha Kamel Selmi
1986: Mustapha Kamel Selmi
1987: Mustapha Kamel Selmi
1988: Mustapha Kamel Selmi
1989: Benyoucef Aïssa Khalifa
1990: Benyoucef Aïssa Khalifa
1991: 
1992: Mustapha Kamel Selmi
1993: Amar Hecini
1994: Amar Hecini
1995: Amar Hecini
1996: Yacine Djellil
1997: Malik Louahla
1998: Malik Louahla
1999: Yacine Djellil
2000: Tayeb Ayache
2001: Yacine Djellil
2002: Yacine Djellil
2003: Malik Louahla
2004: Mohamed Assaïdi
2005: Sofiène Kezzal
2006: Issam Nima

200 metres
1963: Mohamed Louahla
1964: Nadim Nekrouf
1965: Nadim Nekrouf
1966: ?
1967: Saïdi
1968: Saïdi
1969: Belalermi
1970: El Hadi Sayah
1971: Meziane Brahimi
1972: Toufik Chaouch
1973: ?
1974: ?
1975: ?
1976: 
1977: Brahim Badi
1978: 
1979: Brahim Amour
1980: Brahim Badi
1981: Brahim Amour
1982: Brahim Amour
1983: Ali Bakhta
1984: Ali Bakhta
1985: Ali Bakhta
1986: Ali Bakhta
1987: Mustapha Kamel Selmi
1988: Mustapha Kamel Selmi
1989: Mustapha Kamel Selmi
1990: Benyoucef Aïssa Khalifa
1991: Amar Hecini
1992: Amar Hecini
1993: Amar Hecini
1994: Amar Hecini
1995: Amar Hecini
1996: Yacine Djellil
1997: Amar Hecini
1998: Malik Louahla
1999: Yacine Djellil
2000: Yacine Djellil
2001: Malik Louahla
2002: Malik Louahla
2003: Malik Louahla
2004: Malik Louahla
2005: Malik Louahla
2006: Malik Louahla

400 metres
1963: Mohamed Louahla
1964: Idekaideme
1965: Mohamed Louahla
1966: Mohamed Louahla
1967: Baghdadi Si Mohamed
1968: Mohamed Djouad
1969: Mohamed Djouad
1970: Mohamed Djouad
1971: Mohamed Djouad
1972: Mohamed Sid Ali Djouadi
1973: Mohamed Sid Ali Djouadi
1974: ?
1975: Temassini
1976: 
1977: Mohamed Aïssaoui
1978: Mohamed Aïssaoui
1979: Mohamed Aïssaoui
1980: Brahim Amour
1981: Mohamed Aïssaoui
1982: Brahim Amour
1983: Mohamed Aïssaoui
1984: Mohamed Aïssaoui
1985: Mohamed Aïssaoui
1986: Mohamed Filali
1987: Mohamed Aïssaoui
1988: Mohamed Filali
1989: Mohamed Filali
1990: Amar Hecini
1991: Amar Hecini
1992: Amar Hecini
1993: Sadek Boumendil
1994: Sadek Boumendil
1995: Sadek Boumendil
1996: Samir-Adel Louahla
1997: Samir-Adel Louahla
1998: Adem Hecini
1999: Djamel Benaïd
2000: Malik Louahla
2001: Malik Louahla
2002: Adem Hecini
2003: Adem Hecini
2004: Adem Hecini
2005: Fayçal Chérifi
2006: Malik Louahla

800 metres
1963: Baghdadi? Si Mohamed
1964: ?
1965: ?
1966: ?
1967: Baghdadi Si Mohamed
1968: Baghdadi Si Mohamed
1969: Azzedine Azzouzi
1970: Mohamed Sid Ali Djouadi
1971: Mohamed Sid Ali Djouadi
1972: Azzedine Azzouzi
1973: Mohamed Sid Ali Djouadi
1974: ?
1975: ?
1976: Amar Brahmia
1977: Mehdi Aidet
1978: Amar Brahmia
1979: Derradji Harek
1980: Mehdi Aidet
1981: Saïd Ouakli
1982: Saïd Ouakli
1983: Mehdi Aidet
1984: Ahmed Belkessam
1985: Ahmed Belkessam
1986: Ahmed Belkessam
1987: Bouazza Noualla
1988: Réda Abdenouz
1989: Réda Abdenouz
1990: Réda Abdenouz
1991: Ahmed Belkessam
1992: Bouazza Noualla
1993: Kada Mouhaouch
1994: Riad Gatt
1995: Farouk Amaouche
1996: Djabir Saïd-Guerni
1997: Adem Hecini
1998: Djabir Saïd-Guerni
1999: Djabir Saïd-Guerni
2000: Djabir Saïd-Guerni
2001: Adem Hecini
2002: Djabir Saïd-Guerni
2003: ?
2004: Nabil Mahdi
2005: Antar Zerguelaïne
2006: Nabil Mahdi

1500 metres
1963: Djamel Si Mohamed
1964: ?
1965: Djamel Si Mohamed
1966: Baghdadi? Si Mohamed
1967: Abdelatif Derradji
1968: Abdelatif Derradji
1969: Boualem Rahoui
1970: Kamel Guemmar
1971: Mohamed Kacemi
1972: Azzedine Azzouzi
1973: Azzedine Azzouzi
1974: ?
1975: Mohamed Sid Ali Djouadi
1976: 
1977: Mehdi Aidet
1978: Abderrahmane Morceli
1979: El Hachemi Abdenouz
1980: Mehdi Aidet
1981: Mehdi Aidet
1982: Mehdi Aidet
1983: Abderrahmane Morceli
1984: Mehdi Aidet
1985: Abderrahmane Morceli
1986: Rachid Kram
1987: Rachid Kram
1988: Abbès Tehami
1989: Noureddine Morceli
1990: Abdelbaki Brahmi
1991: Azzedine Brahmi
1992: Abdelkrim Benzaï
1993: Abdelhamid Slimani
1994: Abdelhamid Slimani
1995: Réda Benzine
1996: Miloud Abaoub
1997: Abdelhamid Slimani
1998: Abdelhamid Slimani
1999: Mohamed Abdelli
2000: Kamal Boulahfane
2001: Tarek Boukensa
2002: Tarek Boukensa
2003: ?
2004: Tarek Boukensa
2005: Tarek Boukensa
2006: Kamal Boulahfane

5000 metres
1963: Hamida Addéche
1964: ?
1965: Abderrahmane Delhoum
1966: A. Tounsi
1967: Mohamed Gouasmi
1968: Boualem Rahoui
1969: Boualem Rahoui
1970: Mohamed Gouasmi
1971: Mohamed Gouasmi
1972: Djelloul Attalah
1973: Djelloul Attalah
1974: ?
1975: ?
1976: 
1977: Rachid Habchaoui
1978: El Hachemi Abdenouz
1979: ?
1980: Rachid Habchaoui
1981: Rachid Habchaoui
1982: Abderrazak Bounour
1983: El Hachemi Abdenouz
1984: El Hachemi Abdenouz
1985: Abderrazak Bounour
1986: Kamel Kermiche
1987: Miloud Djellal
1988: Miloud Djellal
1989: Mohamed Difallah
1990: Mohamed Difallah
1991: Mohamed Belabbès
1992: Tayeb Lahmar
1993: Mohamed Belabbès
1994: Mohamed Belabbès
1995: Réda Benzine
1996: Tarek Zoghmar
1997: Tarek Zoghmar
1998: Réda Benzine
1999: Miloud Abaoub
2000: Samir Moussaoui
2001: Samir Moussaoui
2002: Khoudir Aggoune
2003: ?
2004: Mohamed Khaldi
2005: Khoudir Aggoune
2006: Khoudir Aggoune

10,000 metres
1963: Behloul Guenaoui
1964: Perritune
1965: Mohamed Iridir
1966: Bensahraoui
1967: Abderrahmane Delhoum
1968: Behloul Guenaoui
1969: Tahar Bounab
1970: Abderrahmane Delhoum
1971: Mohamed Gouasmi
1972: Mohamed Gouasmi
1973: Chérif Benali
1974: ?
1975: ?
1976: Possibly not held
1977: ?
1978: Rachid Habchaoui
1979: ?
1980: Rachid Habchaoui
1981: ?
1982: Rachid Habchaoui
1983: ?
1984: Abderrazak Bounour
1985: Mohamed Kamel Selmi
1986: Sid Ali Sakhri
1987: Abdelhak Hénane
1988: Miloud Djellal
1989: Mohamed Difallah
1990: ?
1991: Miloud Djellal
1992: Mohamed Belabbès
1993: Mahieddine Belhadj
1994: Azzedine Sakhri
1995: Miloud Djellal
1996: Miloud Djellal
1997: Ahmed Boulahia
1998: ?
1999: Mustapha Benacer
2000: Ahmed Boulahia
2001: Abdelkrim Benzaï
2002: Kamel Kohil
2003: ?
2004: Kamel Kohil
2005: ?
2006: ?

One-hour run
1994: Kamel Kohil
1995: ?
1996: Tayeb Bachir Chérif
1997: Amor Dehbi
1998: Ahmed Boulahia
1999: Abdelghani Boudoukha
2000: ?
2001: Abdelkrim Benzaï

20,000 metres
1994: Kamel Kohil
1995: ?
1996: Tayeb Bachir Chérif
1997: Amor Dehbi
1998: Ahmed Boulahia
1999: Abdelghani Boudoukha
2000: ?
2001: Abdelkrim Benzaï

Half marathon
1987: Arezki Hamadache
1988: Not held
1989: Not held
1990: Not held
1991: Not held
1992: Not held
1993: Azzedine Sakhri
1994: Mahieddine Belhadj
1995: Azzedine Sakhri
1996: Kamel Kohil
1997: Ahmed Bouyelli
1998: Rachid Boulanouar
1999: Amor Dehbi
2000: Noureddine Betrim
2001: Saïd Belhout
2002: Abbas Kannouta
2003: ?
2004: ?
2005: Azzedine Zerdoum
2006: ?

Marathon
1977: Lazreg Lakhal
1978: ?
1979: ?
1980: ?
1981: ?
1982: ?
1983: ?
1984: Mohamed Abaidia
1985: Arezki Hamadache
1986: ?
1987: Possibly not held
1988: Farid Belmahdi
1989: Ali Hadj Boudi
1990: ?
1991: Allaoua Khellil
1992: Fateh Haddad
1993: Slimane Touati
1994: ?
1995: Allaoua Khellil
1996: Allaoua Khellil
1997: Rédouane Héchaïchi
1998: Allaoua Khellil
1999: ?
2000: Rabah Azzouz
2001: ?
2002: ?
2003: ?
2004: ?
2005: Azzedine Sakhri
2006: ?

3000 metres steeplechase
1963: Hamoud Ameur
1964: ?
1965: Possibly not held
1966: ?
1967: Ferchichi
1968: Ferchichi
1969: Yahia Mezdoud
1970: Boualem Rahoui
1971: Boualem Rahoui
1972: Mohamed Salem
1973: Mohamed Salem
1974: ?
1975: Boualem Rahoui
1976: Smain Yahiaoui
1977: ?
1978: Mohamed Salem
1979: Lahcen Babaci
1980: Lahcen Babaci
1981: Lahcen Babaci
1982: Boualem Rahoui
1983: Rabah Aboura
1984: Lahcen Babaci
1985: Habib Chérif
1986: Azzedine Brahmi
1987: Habib Chérif
1988: Azzedine Brahmi
1989: Azzedine Brahmi
1990: Habib Chérif
1991: Ferhat Zaïdi
1992: Tayeb Lahmar
1993: Mourad Bouldjadj
1994: Mohamed Belabbès
1995: Mohamed Belabbès
1996: Abderrahmane Daas
1997: Abderrahmane Daas
1998: Laïd Bessou
1999: Mourad Benslimani
2000: Mourad Benslimani
2001: Mourad Benslimani
2002: 
2003: ?
2004: Mohamed Abdelli
2005: Merzak Ould Bouchiba
2006: Med Amine Bensalem

110 metres hurdles
1963: Chidekh
1964: ?
1965: Dali
1966: Benrokia
1967: Abdelkader Boudjemaa
1968: Abdelkader Boudjemaa
1969: Abdelkader Boudjemaa
1970: Abdelkader Boudjemaa
1971: Abdelkader Boudjemaa
1972: Abdelkader Boudjemaa
1973: 
1974: ?
1975: Abdelkader Boudjemaa
1976: 
1977: Mohamed Bensaad
1978: Riad Benhaddad
1979: Riad Benhaddad
1980: Mohamed Bensaad
1981: Riad Benhaddad
1982: Mohamed Bensaad
1983: Riad Benhaddad
1984: Riad Benhaddad
1985: Riad Benhaddad
1986: Noureddine Tadjine
1987: Noureddine Tadjine
1988: Noureddine Tadjine
1989: Noureddine Tadjine
1990: Noureddine Tadjine
1991: Noureddine Tadjine
1992: Karim Karrar
1993: Noureddine Tadjine
1994: Noureddine Tadjine
1995: Noureddine Tadjine
1996: Djelloul Aïbout
1997: Djelloul Aïbout
1998: Rédouane Youcef
1999: Rédouane Youcef
2000: Samir Bouabcha
2001: Abderrahim Dali Bey
2002: Abderrahim Dali Bey
2003: ?
2004: Athmane Hadj Lazib
2005: Mourad Souissi
2006: Athmane Hadj Lazib

400 metres hurdles
1963: Abderrahmane Delhoum
1964: ?
1965: Benyoucef
1966: ?
1967: Mohamed Louahla
1968: Azzedine Azzouzi
1969: ?
1970: Mohamed Djouad
1971: Abdelkader Boudjemaa
1972: Abdelkader Boudjemaa
1973: Mohamed Djouad
1974: ?
1975: ?
1976: 
1977: Lahcene Belhadjoudja
1978: Fayçal Boutella
1979: Lahcene Belhadjoudja
1980: Lahcene Belhadjoudja
1981: Lahcene Belhadjoudja
1982: 
1983: Laouari Benmaghnia
1984: Ali Berrabah
1985: Kamel Zémouri
1986: Lyes Bernaoui
1987: Lyes Bernaoui
1988: Lyes Bernaoui
1989: 
1990: Lyes Bouakline
1991: Amine Hacini
1992: Amine Hacini
1993: 
1994: Amine Harchouche
1995: Ouahid Ketit
1996: Nabil Selmi
1997: Ouahid Ketit
1998: Ouahid Ketit
1999: Ouahid Ketit
2000: Tahar Ghozali
2001: Nabil Selmi
2002: Nabil Selmi
2003: Abdelhamid Amara
2004: Nabil Selmi
2005: Abdelhamid Amara
2006: Abderrahmane Hammadi

High jump
1963: Ali Brakchi
1964: ?
1965: Djerbal
1966: ?
1967: Djerbal
1968: Ould Aoudia
1969: Djerbal
1970: Possibly not held
1971: Tarek Kadri
1972: Amara Korba
1973: 
1974: ?
1975: Hamid Sahil
1976: 
1977: Hamid Sahil
1978: Hamid Sahil
1979: Hamid Sahil
1980: Hamid Sahil
1981: Abdenour Krim
1982: Abdenour Krim
1983: Abdenour Krim
1984: Azzedine Mostéfa
1985: Azzedine Mostéfa
1986: Abdenour Krim
1987: Nabil Berbiche
1988: Othmane Belfaa
1989: Othmane Belfaa
1990: Othmane Belfaa
1991: Othmane Belfaa
1992: Othmane Belfaa
1993: Othmane Belfaa
1994: Othmane Belfaa
1995: Yacine Mousli
1996: Yacine Mousli
1997: Abderrahmane Hammad
1998: Abderrahmane Hammad
1999: Abderrahmane Hammad
2000: Abderrahmane Hammad
2001: Abderrahmane Hammad
2002: Abderrahmane Hammad
2003: Abderrahmane Hammad
2004: Abderrahmane Hammad
2005: Abderrahmane Hammad
2006: Mohamed Benhadia

Pole vault
1966: Belhamiti
1967: Possibly not held
1968: Possibly not held
1969: ?
1970: Haddadi
1971: Djamel Bouzerar
1972: Djamel Bouzerar
1973: Ahmed Rezki
1974: ?
1975: Lakhdar Rahal
1976: 
1977: ?
1978: Ahmed Rezki
1979: Ahmed Rezki
1980: ?
1981: Mohamed Bensaad
1982: Mourad Mahour Bacha
1983: Mohamed Bensaad
1984: Mourad Mahour Bacha
1985: Mourad Mahour Bacha
1986: Samir Agsous
1987: Samir Agsous
1988: Samir Agsous
1989: Sami Si Mohamed
1990: Samir Agsous
1991: Sid Ali Sabour
1992: Samir Agsous
1993: Belgacem Touami
1994: Rafik Mefti
1995: Rafik Mefti
1996: Rafik Mefti
1997: Abderrazak Yahiaoui
1998: Rafik Mefti
1999: Rafik Mefti
2000: Rafik Mefti
2001: Rafik Mefti
2002: Rafik Mefti
2003: ?
2004: Rafik Mefti
2005: Amine Hafed
2006: Mouloud Ziani

Long jump
1963: Ali Brakchi
1964: ?
1965: Douar
1966: Douar
1967: Youcef Boulfelfel
1968: Maazouz
1969: Youcef Boulfelfel
1970: Bouziane
1971: Hocine Boudiffa
1972: Hocine Boudiffa
1973: ?
1974: ?
1975: ?
1976: ?
1977: Ahmed Rezki
1978: 
1979: Saïd Saad
1980: Othmane Belfaa
1981: Ahmed Benazoug
1982: ?
1983: Bachir Messikh
1984: Ahmed Benazoug
1985: Djamel Mébarki
1986: Nacer Saadoune
1987: Ahmed Benazoug
1988: Lotfi Khaïda
1989: Lotfi Khaïda
1990: Nadir Si Mohamed
1991: Lotfi Khaïda
1992: Féthi Amira
1993: Abderrahmane Hadjou
1994: Lotfi Khaïda
1995: Nabil Adamou
1996: Farid Hassa
1997: Féthi Amira
1998: Rédouane Youcef
1999: Issam Nima
2000: Rédouane Youcef
2001: Rédouane Youcef
2002: Nabil Adamou
2003: ?
2004: Issam Nima
2005: Issam Nima
2006: Issam Nima

Triple jump
1963: Ali Brakchi
1964: ?
1965: Youcef Boulfelfel
1966: Ould Ahmed
1967: Possibly not held
1968: Maazouz
1969: Youcef Boulfelfel
1970: Youcef Boulfelfel
1971: Lakhdar Merouane
1972: Lakhdar Merouane
1973: ?
1974: ?
1975: ?
1976: 
1977: Saïd Saad
1978: Saïd Saad
1979: Saïd Saad
1980: Saïd Saad
1981: Saïd Saad
1982: Saïd Saad
1983: Saïd Saad
1984: Saïd Saad
1985: Azzedine Talhi
1986: Abdelhamid Sekkaï
1987: Lotfi Khaïda
1988: Lotfi Khaïda
1989: Lotfi Khaïda
1990: Soulimane Ouabel
1991: Lotfi Khaïda
1992: Soulimane Ouabel
1993: Lotfi Khaïda
1994: Lotfi Khaïda
1995: Lotfi Khaïda
1996: Areslane Belkheïr
1997: Féthi Amira
1998: Féthi Amira
1999: Areslane Belkheïr
2000: Areslane Belkheïr
2001: Areslane Belkheïr
2002: Hamza Ménina
2003: ?
2004: Hamza Ménina
2005: Hamza Ménina
2006: Hocine Benchikh

Shot put
1963: Ali Brakchi
1964: ?
1965: Noureddine? Bendifallah
1966: Noureddine Bendifallah
1967: Noureddine Bendifallah
1968: Ahmed Bendifallah
1969: Ahmed Bendifallah
1970: Ahmed Bendifallah
1971: Jean-Marie Djebaili
1972: Jean-Marie Djebaili
1973: Jean-Marie Djebaili
1974: ?
1975: ?
1976: ?
1977: ?
1978: 
1979: Fillali Hadj Brahim
1980: ?
1981: 
1982: 
1983: Mourad Mahour Bacha
1984: Mourad Mahour Bacha
1985: Mourad Mahour Bacha
1986: Mourad Mahour Bacha
1987: Tahar Chachoua
1988: Mahrez Talaboulma
1989: Mahrez Talaboulma
1990: Mahrez Talaboulma
1991: Wahid Bakhli
1992: Tahar Chachoua
1993: Tahar Chachoua
1994: Tahar Chachoua
1995: Tahar Chachoua
1996: Tahar Chachoua
1997: Khalil Slimani
1998: Khalil Slimani
1999: Khalil Slimani
2000: Khalil Slimani
2001: Khalil Slimani
2002: Khalil Slimani
2003: ?
2004: Abdelkader Belalia
2005: Nassim Kaci
2006: Malek Yefsah

Discus throw
1963: Maachou
1964: ?
1965: Ahmed Bendifallah
1966: ?
1967: Ahmed Bendifallah
1968: Ahmed Bendifallah
1969: ?
1970: Ahmed Bendifallah
1971: ?
1972: Jean-Marie Djebaili
1973: 
1974: ?
1975: ?
1976: 
1977: ?
1978: Fillali Hadj Brahim
1979: Abdellah Boubekeur
1980: ?
1981: 
1982: 
1983: Yacine Louail
1984: Yacine Louail
1985: Mourad Mahour Bacha
1986: Yacine Louail
1987: Yacine Louail
1988: Yacine Louail
1989: Yacine Louail
1990: Yacine Louail
1991: Mourad Mahour Bacha
1992: Mourad Mahour Bacha
1993: Mourad Mahour Bacha
1994: Yacine Louail
1995: Abderrazak Yahiaoui
1996: Hakim Yahiaoui
1997: Walid Boudaoui
1998: Abderrazak Yahiaoui
1999: Walid Boudaoui
2000: Walid Boudaoui
2001: Walid Boudaoui
2002: Walid Boudaoui
2003: ?
2004: Walid Boudaoui
2005: Walid Boudaoui
2006: Hakim Yahiaoui

Hammer throw
1970: Noureddine Bendifallah
1971: Possibly not held
1972: Possibly not held
1973: Noureddine Bendifallah
1974: ?
1975: ?
1976: 
1977: ?
1978: Abdellah Boubekeur
1979: Abdellah Boubekeur
1980: Abdellah Boubekeur
1981: ?
1982: Hakim Toumi
1983: Hakim Toumi
1984: Hakim Toumi
1985: Hakim Toumi
1986: Hakim Toumi
1987: Hakim Toumi
1988: Hakim Toumi
1989: Hakim Toumi
1990: Hakim Toumi
1991: Samir Haouam
1992: Hakim Toumi
1993: Hakim Toumi
1994: Hakim Toumi
1995: Hakim Toumi
1996: Hakim Toumi
1997: Hakim Toumi
1998: Hakim Toumi
1999: Samir Haouam
2000: Samir Haouam
2001: Samir Haouam
2002: Samir Haouam
2003: Hakim Toumi
2004: Samir Haouam
2005: Samir Haouam
2006: Samir Haouam

Javelin throw
1963: Djerbal
1964: ?
1965: Possibly not held
1966: Nadjari
1967: Nadjari
1968: Maamar Boubekeur
1969: Djerbal
1970: Maamar Boubekeur
1971: Maamar Boubekeur
1972: Takorabet
1973: 
1974: ?
1975: ?
1976: 
1977: Maamar Boubekeur
1978: Maamar Boubekeur
1979: Salim Benniou
1980: 
1981: ?
1982: Allel Boulmahli
1983: Mourad Mahour Bacha
1984: Mourad Mahour Bacha
1985: Mourad Mahour Bacha
1986: Mourad Mahour Bacha
1987: Mourad Mahour Bacha
1988: Mourad Mahour Bacha
1989: Mourad Mahour Bacha
1990: Samir Ménouar
1991: Samir Ménouar
1992: Mourad Mahour Bacha
1993: Mourad Mahour Bacha
1994: Riad Guellati
1995: Kheïr Regam
1996: Kheïr Regam
1997: Youcef Bensaha
1998: Youcef Bensaha
1999: Youcef Bensaha
2000: Youcef Bensaha
2001: Youcef Bensaha
2002: Youcef Bensaha
2003: ?
2004: Nassim Mokrani
2005: ?
2006: Nassim Mokrani

Decathlon
1972: Mohamed Bensaad
1973: ?
1974: ?
1975: ?
1976: ?
1977: ?
1978: ?
1979: ?
1980: ?
1981: ?
1982: Mourad Mahour Bacha
1983: ?
1984: Mourad Mahour Bacha
1985: Mahmoud Aït Ouhamou
1986: Mahmoud Aït Ouhamou
1987: ?
1988: ?
1989: Mahmoud Aït Ouhamou
1990: ?
1991: Sid Ali Sabour
1992: Mourad Mahour Bacha
1993: ?
1994: ?
1995: Sid Ali Sabour
1996: Sid Ali Sabour
1997: Rédouane Youcef
1998: Rédouane Youcef
1999: Rédouane Youcef
2000: Mohamed Benyahia
2001: ?
2002: Rédouane Youcef
2003: ?
2004: ?
2005: Rédouane Youcef
2006: ?

10,000 metres walk
1972: Mohamed Meskari
1973: Possibly not held
1974: ?
1975: ?
1976: ?
1977: ?
1978: ?
1979: ?
1980: ?
1981: Benamar Kachkouche
1982: Benamar Kachkouche
1983: ?
1984: Not held
1985: Not held
1986: Not held
1987: Not held
1988: Not held
1989: Not held
1990: Not held
1991: Moussa Aouanouk
1992: Abdelwahab Ferguène
1993: Abdelwahab Ferguène
1994: Younès Aouanouk
1995: Moussa Aouanouk
1996: Lounès Méhadi
1997: Moussa Aouanouk
1998: ?
1999: Moussa Aouanouk
2000: Moussa Aouanouk
2001: Arezki Yahiaoui
2002: Moussa Aouanouk
2003: ?
2004: ?
2005: ?
2006: ?

20 kilometres walk
The championships in 1978, 1984, 1985 and 1986 were held on a track. The course for the 1988 championship was short.
1969: Mohamed Meskari
1970: Possibly not held
1971: Possibly not held
1972: Possibly not held
1973: Possibly not held
1974: ?
1975: ?
1976: ?
1977: ?
1978: Benamar Kachkouche
1979: ?
1980: ?
1981: Possibly not held
1982: Possibly not held
1983: ?
1984: Hamid Mécifi
1985: Abdelwahab Ferguène
1986: Arezki Boumrar
1987: ?
1988: Abdelwahab Ferguène
1989: Abdelwahab Ferguène
1990: Abdelwahab Ferguène
1991: ?
1992: Abderrahmane Djebbar
1993: ?
1994: ?
1995: Lounès Méhadi
1996: Lounès Méhadi
1997: Lounès Méhadi
1998: Moussa Aouanouk
1999: Moussa Aouanouk
2000: Moussa Aouanouk
2001: ?
2002: ?
2003: ?
2004: Mohamed Ameur
2005: Moussa Aouanouk
2006: Hichem Medjeber

50 kilometres walk
1987: H'mimed Rahouli

Cross country (long course)
1963: Abderrahmane Delhoum
1964: Bensahraoui
1965: Hamida Addéche
1966: Abdelkader Benyettou
1967: Aïssa Benfarès
1968: Aïssa Benfarès
1969: Ferchichi
1970: Mohamed Gouasmi
1971: Mohamed Kacemi
1972: Mohamed Gouasmi
1973: Chérif Benali
1974: Mohamed Kacemi
1975: Djelloul Rezig
1976: Boualem Rahoui
1977: Mahmoud Hazzazi
1978: Boualem Rahoui
1979: Lahcen Babaci
1980: Rachid Habchaoui
1981: El Hachemi Abdenouz
1982: El Hachemi Abdenouz
1983: Boualem Rahoui
1984: Rachid Habchaoui
1985: Abderrazak Bounour
1986: Lasmani Merzougui
1987: Mahieddine Belhadj
1988: Abbès Tehami
1989: Abbès Tehami
1990: Mohamed Difallah
1991: Mahieddine Belhadj
1992: Mourad Bouldjadj
1993: Yahia Azaïdj
1994: Yahia Azaïdj
1995: Azzedine Sakhri
1996: ?
1997: Kamel Kohil
1998: Azzedine Sakhri
1999: Kamel Kohil
2000: Miloud Abaoub
2001: Kamel Kohil
2002: ?
2003: Kamel Kohil
2004: Ahmed Naïli
2005: Khoudir Aggoune
2006: Ahmed Naïli

Cross country (short course)
1976: Tizraoui
1977: Mehdi Aidet
1978: Abderrahmane Morceli
1979: Derradji Harek
1980: Mehdi Aidet
1981: Derradji Harek
1982: Possibly not held
1983: Possibly not held
1984: Mourad Mouats
1985: Possibly not held
1986: Possibly not held
1987: Possibly not held
1988: Possibly not held
1989: Possibly not held
1990: Possibly not held
1991: Possibly not held
1992: Possibly not held
1993: Possibly not held
1994: Possibly not held
1995: Possibly not held
1996: Possibly not held
1997: Possibly not held
1998: Abdelrahmane Djemadi
1999: Laïd Bessou
2000: Laïd Bessou
2001: Kamal Boulahfane
2002: ?
2003: Khoudir Aggoune
2004: Samir Moussaoui
2005: Khoudir Aggoune
2006: Khoudir Aggoune

Women

100 metres
1963: Mouelfi
1964: Mouelfi
1965: Mouelfi
1966: ?
1967: Rabea Ghezlane
1968: Zadek
1969: ?
1970: Larbi
1971: Larbi
1972: Istitene
1973: Fouzia Ramla
1974: ?
1975: Fouzia Ramla
1976: Kebaili
1977: Kebaili
1978: Nouria Redaouia
1979: Fatima Mefti
1980: ?
1981: Fatima Mefti
1982: Souad Chouider
1983: Rachida Ferdjaoui
1984: Souad Chouider
1985: Rachida Ferdjaoui
1986: Yasmina Azzizi-Kettab
1987: Mahdjouba Bouhdiba
1988: Rachida Ferdjaoui
1989: Yasmina Azzizi-Kettab
1990: Nadia Abdou
1991: Nadia Abdou
1992: Nouria Mérah
1993: Saliha Hammadi
1994: Saliha Hammadi
1995: Saliha Hammadi
1996: Ahlem Allali
1997: Baya Rahouli
1998: Baya Rahouli
1999: Baya Rahouli
2000: Houria Moussa
2001: Houria Moussa
2002: Houria Moussa
2003: ?
2004: Malika Ali Bacha
2005: Houria Moussa
2006: Houria Moussa

200 metres
1963: Mouelfi
1964: ?
1965: Mouelfi
1966: Mouelfi
1967: Rabea Ghezlane
1968: Zadek
1969: ?
1970: Zerouti
1971: Larbi
1972: Khalfaoui
1973: Fouzia Ramla
1974: ?
1975: ?
1976: Fouzia Ramla
1977: Fouzia Ramla
1978: Nouria Redaouia
1979: Fatima Mefti
1980: ?
1981: Fatima Mefti
1982: Souad Chouider
1983: Rachida Ferdjaoui
1984: Souad Chouider
1985: Rachida Ferdjaoui
1986: Mahdjouba Bouhdiba
1987: Mahdjouba Bouhdiba
1988: Rachida Ferdjaoui
1989: Yasmina Azzizi-Kettab
1990: Nadia Abdou
1991: Nadia Abdou
1992: Nouria Mérah
1993: Mokhtaria Safi
1994: Nouria Mérah
1995: Saliha Hammadi
1996: Nahida Touhami
1997: Saliha Hammadi
1998: Mokhtaria Bensayah
1999: Hamida Benhocine
2000: Houria Moussa
2001: Sarah Arrous
2002: Houria Moussa
2003: ?
2004: Houria Moussa
2005: Nadia Rémaoune
2006: Houria Moussa

400 metres
1963: Khorsi
1964: ?
1965: Possibly not held
1966: Hariba
1967: Ramdani
1968: Possibly not held
1969: Zadek
1970: Goucem? Cherfi
1971: Goucem Cherfi
1972: Goucem Cherfi
1973: Goucem Cherfi
1974: ?
1975: Messaouda Ouchérif
1976: Leïla Idir
1977: Sakina Boutamine
1978: 
1979: Sakina Boutamine
1980: Dalila Baouche
1981: Dalila Baouche
1982: Dalila Harek
1983: Dalila Harek
1984: Amal Boudjelti
1985: Rachida Ferdjaoui
1986: Hassiba Hallilou
1987: Bahria Khenniche
1988: Dalila Harek
1989: 
1990: Amal Boudjelti
1991: Nouria Mérah
1992: Nouria Mérah
1993: Hassiba Hallilou
1994: Nouria Mérah
1995: Nouria Mérah
1996: Lynda Kabous
1997: Lynda Kabous
1998: Nahida Touhami
1999: Amal Baraket
2000: Nahida Touhami
2001: Sarah Arrous
2002: Sarah Arrous
2003: Nahida Touhami
2004: Sarah Arrous
2005: Amel Zighem
2006: Amel Zighem

800 metres
1963: Khorsi
1964: ?
1965: Chaouch
1966: ?
1967: Mériem
1968: Fatima Ariane
1969: ?
1970: Goucem? Cherfi
1971: Goucem Cherfi
1972: O. Cherfi
1973: ?
1974: ?
1975: ?
1976: ?
1977: Sakina Boutamine
1978: Leïla Boudina
1979: Sakina Boutamine
1980: Sakina Boutamine
1981: Dalila Baouche
1982: Dalila Harek
1983: Dalila Méhira
1984: Mébarka Hadj Abdellah
1985: Mébarka Hadj Abdellah
1986: Salima Djelloul
1987: Hassiba Boulmerka
1988: Hassiba Boulmerka
1989: Hassiba Boulmerka
1990: Zahia Kaoud
1991: Zahia Kaoud
1992: Zahia Kaoud
1993: Anissa Khali
1994: Anissa Khali
1995: Nouria Mérah
1996: Saliha Kacemi
1997: Saliha Kacemi
1998: Wahiba Attout
1999: Salima Lardjam
2000: Nouria Mérah-Benida
2001: Nouria Mérah-Benida
2002: Nahida Touhami
2003: Nouria Mérah-Benida
2004: Widad Mendil
2005: Chahrazed Cheboub
2006: Nouria Mérah-Benida

1500 metres
1969: ?
1970: Nabil
1971: O. Cherfi
1972: Fadila? Sabri
1973: Fatma Youcef
1974: ?
1975: Fatma Youcef
1976: Salima Méhenni
1977: Fatma Youcef
1978: Sakina Boutamine
1979: ?
1980: Sakina Boutamine
1981: Dalila Méhira
1982: Dalila Méhira
1983: Dalila Méhira
1984: Leïla Bendahmane
1985: Mébarka Hadj Abdellah
1986: Mébarka Hadj Abdellah
1987: Hassiba Boulmerka
1988: Hassiba Boulmerka
1989: Hassiba Boulmerka
1990: Hassiba Boulmerka
1991: Mébarka Hadj Abdellah
1992: Saliha Kacemi
1993: Leïla Bendahmane
1994: Anissa Khali
1995: Saliha Kacemi
1996: Nasria Baghdad-Azaïdj
1997: Kheïra Arfa
1998: Kheïra Arfa
1999: Nahida Touhami
2000: Khadija Touati
2001: Khadija Touati
2002: Khadija Touati
2003: ?
2004: Widad Mendil
2005: Fatiha Bahi Azzouhoum
2006: Nahida Touhami

3000 metres
1979: ?
1980: ?
1981: ?
1982: Dalila Méhira
1983: ?
1984: Leïla Bendahmane
1985: Malika Bellounis
1986: Mébarka Hadj Abdellah
1987: Malika Benhabylès
1988: Mébarka Hadj Abdellah
1989: Mébarka Hadj Abdellah
1990: Mébarka Hadj Abdellah
1991: Mébarka Hadj Abdellah
1992: Rahmouna Tahrour
1993: Leïla Bendahmane

5000 metres
1991: Zahra Djami Khédim
1992: Possibly not held
1993: Possibly not held
1994: Nasria Baghdad-Azaïdj
1995: Leïla Bendahmane
1996: Nasria Baghdad-Azaïdj
1997: Souad Aït Salem
1998: Souad Aït Salem
1999: Fouzia Zoutat
2000: Nasria Baghdad-Azaïdj
2001: Nasria Baghdad-Azaïdj
2002: Souad Aït Salem
2003: ?
2004: Souad Aït Salem
2005: Souad Aït Salem
2006: Souad Aït Salem

10,000 metres
1988: Malika Benhabylès
1989: Dalila Méhira
1990: ?
1991: Possibly not held
1992: Amina Chaabane
1993: ?
1994: Nasria Baghdad-Azaïdj
1995: ?
1996: Leïla Bendahmane
1997: ?
1998: Dalila Tahi
1999: Nasria Baghdad-Azaïdj
2000: ?
2001: Fouzia Zoutat
2002: Souad Aït Salem
2003: ?
2004: Nasria Baghdad-Azaïdj
2005: ?
2006: ?

Half marathon
1994: Wassila Aïssani
1995: ?
1996: Leïla Bendahmane
1997: Nasria Baghdad-Azaïdj
1998: Faroudja Larabi
1999: Nasria Baghdad-Azaïdj
2000: Souad Aït Salem
2001: Souad Aït Salem
2002: ?
2003: ?
2004: ?
2005: Kenza Dahmani
2006: ?

Marathon
1989: Dalila Méhira
1990: ?
1991: Amina Chaabane
1992: Amina Chaabane
1993: ?
1994: ?
1995: Hamida Mazouzi
1996: Amina Chaabane
1997: Wassila Aïssani
1998: Dalila Méhira
1999: ?
2000: Amina Nemri
2001: ?
2002: ?
2003: ?
2004: ?
2005: Fadil Hamasse
2006: ?

3000 metres steeplechase
2003: ?
2004: Nacèra Mescari
2005: Khadija Touati
2006: Fatiha Bahi Azzouhoum

80 metres hurdles
1963: Possibly not held
1964: ?
1965: Bouzerar
1966: ?
1967: Possibly not held
1968: Rabea Ghezlane

100 metres hurdles
1969: ?
1970: Kerdjou
1971: Saihi
1972: Toumi
1973: Karima Henni
1974: ?
1975: Karima Henni
1976: ?
1977: Samia Asselah
1978: Zineb Addouz
1979: Yamina Bourzama
1980: ?
1981: Dalila Tayebi
1982: Nacèra Achir
1983: Karima Henni
1984: Nacèra Achir
1985: Nacèra Achir
1986: Yasmina Azzizi-Kettab
1987: Nacèra Zaaboub
1988: Fazia Gaouaoui
1989: Yasmina Azzizi-Kettab
1990: Nacèra Zaaboub
1991: Nacèra Zaaboub
1992: Nora Hassani
1993: Nouria Mérah
1994: Yasmina Azzizi-Kettab
1995: Nacèra Zaaboub
1996: Ahlem Allali
1997: Baya Rahouli
1998: Naïma Bentahar
1999: Baya Rahouli
2000: Naïma Bentahar
2001: Yasmina Azzizi-Kettab
2002: Naïma Bentahar
2003: ?
2004: Naïma Bentahar
2005: Sarah Bouaoudia
2006: Samira Harouche

400 metres hurdles
1979: ?
1980: Yamina Bourzama
1981: Nacèra Chétaibi
1982: 
1983: Nacèra Chétaibi
1984: Possibly not held
1985: Nacèra Achir
1986: Rachida Ferdjaoui
1987: Nacèra Chétaibi
1988: Nacèra Chétaibi
1989: 
1990: Fatima Zahra Djellal
1991: Amal Baraket
1992: Amal Baraket
1993: Amal Baraket
1994: Amal Baraket
1995: Amal Baraket
1996: Nora Hassani
1997: Hadjira Sifouani
1998: Nora Hassani
1999: Nora Hassani
2000: Nora Hassani
2001: Nora Hassani
2002: Sarah Arrous
2003: Samira Harrouche
2004: Houria Moussa
2005: Houria Moussa
2006: Amel Zighem

High jump
1963: Skander
1964: ?
1965: Possibly not held
1966: Farida Chaouch
1967: Possibly not held
1968: Farida Chaouch
1969: ?
1970: Farida Chaouch
1971: Possibly not held
1972: Saihi
1973: ?
1974: ?
1975: ?
1976: Yamina Bourzama
1977: Yamina Bourzama
1978: Yamina Bourzama
1979: Yamina Bourzama
1980: Dalila Tayebi
1981: Nacèra Achir
1982: ?
1983: Nacèra Achir
1984: Nacèra Achir
1985: Ramdane Djellaoui
1986: Nacèra Zaaboub
1987: Nacèra Zaaboub
1988: Zahira Attar
1989: Nacèra Zaaboub
1990: Nacèra Zaaboub
1991: Nacèra Zaaboub
1992: Radia Mellal
1993: Nacèra Zaaboub
1994: Nacèra Zaaboub
1995: Nacèra Zaaboub
1996: Nacèra Zaaboub
1997: Zahira Nedjraoui
1998: Sarah Bouaoudia
1999: Sarah Bouaoudia
2000: Hamida Benhocine
2001: Nacèra Belgroune
2002: Amina Lemgherbi
2003: ?
2004: Amina Lemgherbi
2005: Sarah Bouaoudia
2006: Sarah Bouaoudia

Pole vault
1995: Jessika Hellala
1996: Mehdia Aïssiou
1997: Jessika Hellala
1998: Jessika Hellala
1999: Amina Chahreddine
2000: Amina Chahreddine
2001: Sonia Smili
2002: Sonia Smili
2003: ?
2004: Wahiba Hamreras
2005: Amina Chahreddine
2006: Wahiba Hamreras

Long jump
1963: Nurieffi
1964: ?
1965: Mouelfi
1966: Benmaghnia
1967: Rabea Ghezlane
1968: Istitene
1969: ?
1970: Kerdjou
1971: Kerdjou
1972: Istitene
1973: ?
1974: ?
1975: ?
1976: ?
1977: Yamina Bourzama
1978: Dalila Tayebi
1979: Dalila Tayebi
1980: Dalila Tayebi
1981: Dalila Tayebi
1982: Dalila Tayebi
1983: Dalila Tayebi
1984: Dalila Tayebi
1985: Dalila Tayebi
1986: Yasmina Azzizi-Kettab
1987: Nacèra Zaaboub
1988: Nadia Abdou
1989: Yasmina Azzizi-Kettab
1990: Nacèra Zaaboub
1991: Nacèra Zaaboub
1992: Saliha Hammadi
1993: Naïma Baraket
1994: Nacèra Zaaboub
1995: Nacèra Zaaboub
1996: Nacèra Zaaboub
1997: Baya Rahouli
1998: Baya Rahouli
1999: Baya Rahouli
2000: Yasmina Azzizi-Kettab
2001: Yasmina Azzizi-Kettab
2002: Baya Rahouli
2003: ?
2004: Baya Rahouli
2005: Sarah Bouaoudia
2006: Sarah Bouaoudia

Triple jump
1991: Naïma Baraket
1992: Naïma Baraket
1993: Naïma Baraket
1994: Naïma Baraket
1995: Baya Rahouli
1996: Naïma Baraket
1997: Baya Rahouli
1998: Rahima Issaad
1999: Baya Rahouli
2000: Baya Rahouli
2001: Baya Rahouli
2002: Baya Rahouli
2003: Baya Rahouli
2004: Baya Rahouli
2005: Kamilia Sahnoun
2006: Kamilia Sahnoun

Shot put
1963: Atmani
1964: ?
1965: Atmani
1966: Djillali
1967: Possibly not held
1968: Possibly not held
1969: ?
1970: Possibly not held
1971: Mouhoub
1972: Mouhoub
1973: Boukraa
1974: ?
1975: ?
1976: ?
1977: Fatiha Larab
1978: Fatiha Larab
1979: Fatiha Larab
1980: Aïcha Dahmous
1981: Fatiha Larab
1982: Fatiha Larab
1983: Aïcha Dahmous
1984: Aïcha Dahmous
1985: Fatiha Larab
1986: Fatiha Larab
1987: Aïcha Dahmous
1988: Fatiha Larab
1989: 
1990: Nacèra Zaaboub
1991: Ghania Touil
1992: Malika Hammou
1993: Nacèra Zaaboub
1994: Yasmina Azzizi-Kettab
1995: Yasmina Azzizi-Kettab
1996: Yasmina Azzizi-Kettab
1997: Baya Rahouli
1998: Kenza Hedjène
1999: Soraya Mehdioui
2000: Yasmina Azzizi-Kettab
2001: Nouria Nesnas
2002: Yasmina Azzizi-Kettab
2003: ?
2004: Saliha Zékiski
2005: Saliha Zékiski
2006: Saliha Zékiski

Discus throw
1963: Atmani
1964: ?
1965: Atmani
1966: ?
1967: Possibly not held
1968: Rabea Ghezlane
1969: Menallah
1970: Mouhoub
1971: Possibly not held
1972: Naziha Moulay
1973: Boukraa
1974: ?
1975: ?
1976: ?
1977: Djamila Aït Dib
1978: Djamila Aït Dib
1979: Djamila Aït Dib
1980: ?
1981: Djamila Aït Dib
1982: Aïcha Dahmous
1983: Aïcha Dahmous
1984: Aïcha Dahmous
1985: Aïcha Dahmous
1986: Aïcha Dahmous
1987: Aïcha Dahmous
1988: Aïcha Dahmous
1989: Aïcha Dahmous
1990: Aïcha Dahmous
1991: Ghania Touil
1992: Akila Ziane
1993: Aïcha Dahmous
1994: Malika Hammou
1995: Malika Hammou
1996: Kenza Hedjène
1997: Kenza Hedjène
1998: Kenza Hedjène
1999: Saliha Zékiski
2000: Lamia Hanouti
2001: Nouria Nesnas
2002: Saliha Zékiski
2003: ?
2004: Saliha Zékiski
2005: Saliha Zékiski
2006: Saliha Zékiski

Hammer throw
1993: Samia Dahmani
1994: Samia Dahmani
1995: Samia Dahmani
1996: Samia Dahmani
1997: Djida Yalloulène
1998: Djida Yalloulène
1999: Djida Yalloulène
2000: Djida Yalloulène
2001: Tounès Messaoudi
2002: Rémila Mindjou
2003: ?
2004: Rémila Mindjou
2005: ?
2006: Rémila Mindjou

Javelin throw
1963: Possibly not held
1964: ?
1965: Atmani
1966: Belbraik
1967: Possibly not held
1968: Possibly not held
1969: ?
1970: Possibly not held
1971: Possibly not held
1972: Berkane
1973: Hamarat
1974: ?
1975: ?
1976: ?
1977: Nouria Kédideh
1978: Nouria Kédideh
1979: Nouria Kédideh
1980: Nouria Kédideh
1981: Samia Djémaa
1982: Nouria Kédideh
1983: Nouria Kédideh
1984: Samia Djémaa
1985: Samia Djémaa
1986: Samia Djémaa
1987: Samia Djémaa
1988: Samia Djémaa
1989: Yasmina Azzizi-Kettab
1990: Nacèra Zaaboub
1991: Malika Hammou
1992: Malika Hammou
1993: Malika Hammou
1994: Yasmina Azzizi-Kettab
1995: Yasmina Azzizi-Kettab
1996: Yasmina Azzizi-Kettab
1997: Rachida Dahmani
1998: Faiza Kadri
1999: Lynda Kessaï
2000: Yasmina Azzizi-Kettab
2001: Yasmina Azzizi-Kettab
2002: Yasmina Azzizi-Kettab
2003: ?
2004: Lamia Hanouti
2005: Faiza Kadri
2006: Zahra Badrane

Heptathlon
1980: ?
1981: ?
1982: Dalila Tayebi
1983: ?
1984: Yasmina Azzizi-Kettab
1985: Wassila Aïssani
1986: Yasmina Azzizi-Kettab
1987: ?
1988: ?
1989: ?
1990: ?
1991: Nacèra Zaaboub
1992: Nacèra Zaaboub
1993: ?
1994: ?
1995: Baya Rahouli
1996: Nacèra Zaaboub
1997: Sonia Smili
1998: Sabrina Baraket
1999: Mounia Fetni
2000: Yasmina Azzizi-Kettab
2001: ?
2002: Nacèra Belgroune
2003: ?
2004: ?
2005: Assia Gharbi
2006: ?

5000 metres walk
1983: Sabiha Mansouri
1984: Zahra Oulmi
1985: Possibly not held
1986: Sabiha Mansouri
1987: Sabiha Mansouri
1988: Sabiha Mansouri
1989: Possibly not held
1990: Dounia Kara
1991: Dounia Kara
1992: Fariza Touat
1993: Dounia Kara
1994: Dounia Kara
1995: Dounia Kara
1996: Nabila Yacia
1997: Dounia Kara
1998: Dounia Kara
1999: Dounia Mimouni
2000: Dounia Mimouni

5 kilometres walk
1989: Sabiha Mansouri
1998: Dounia Kara

10 kilometres walk
1987: Sabiha Mansouri
1988: Possibly not held
1989: Not held
1990: Possibly not held
1991: Possibly not held
1992: Dounia Kara
1993: ?
1994: ?
1995: Dounia Kara
1996: Dounia Kara
1997: Nabila Yacia
1998: Not held
1999: Bahia Boussad
2000: Bahia Boussad
2001: Dounia Mimouni
2002: Bahia Boussad
2003: ?
2004: Bahia Boussad
2005: Bahia Boussad

20 kilometres walk
2005: Bahia Boussad
2006: Bahia Boussad

Cross country (long course)
1963: Boussalah
1964: Ali Nouri
1965: Merabtane
1966: Hares
1967: A. Addou
1968: Naoum
1969: Fatima Ariane
1970: Fatima Ariane
1971: Nabil
1972: Goucem Cherfi
1973: Goucem Cherfi
1974: Farida Hellal
1975: Fatma Youcef
1976: Sakina Boutamine
1977: Sakina Boutamine
1978: Sakina Boutamine
1979: Leïla Boudina
1980: Leïla Boudina
1981: Sakina Boutamine
1982: Dalila Méhira
1983: Dalila Méhira
1984: Leïla Bendahmane
1985: Mébarka Hadj Abdellah
1986: Mébarka Hadj Abdellah
1987: Mébarka Hadj Abdellah
1988: Mébarka Hadj Abdellah
1989: Mébarka Hadj Abdellah
1990: Mébarka Hadj Abdellah
1991: Zahra Djami Khédim
1992: Amina Chaabane
1993: Hadda Djakhdjakha
1994: Leïla Bendahmane
1995: Nasria Baghdad-Azaïdj
1996: ?
1997: Nasria Baghdad-Azaïdj
1998: Fatiha Hanika
1999: Nasria Baghdad-Azaïdj
2000: Nasria Baghdad-Azaïdj
2001: Dalila Tahi
2002: ?
2003: Nasria Azaiez
2004: Nasria Baghdad-Azaïdj
2005: Fatiha Bahi Azzouhoum
2006: Kenza Dahmani

Cross country (short course)
1998: Kheïra Arfa
1999: Khadija Touati
2000: Nouria Mérah-Benida
2001: Nasria Baghdad-Azaïdj
2002: ?
2003: Nouria Mérah-Benida
2004: Nasria Baghdad-Azaïdj
2005: Fatiha Bahi Azzouhoum

References

Champions 1963–2006
Algerian Championships. GBR Athletics. Retrieved 2021-02-12.

Winners
 List
Algerian Championships
Athletics